{{Infobox election
| election_name = 2012 United States Senate election in West Virginia
| country = West Virginia
| type = presidential
| ongoing = no
| previous_election = 2010 United States Senate special election in West Virginia
| previous_year = 2010 (special)
| next_election = 2018 United States Senate election in West Virginia
| next_year = 2018
| election_date = 
| image_size = 160x180px
| turnout = 46.3% (voting eligible)
| image1 = 
| nominee1 = Joe Manchin
| party1 = Democratic Party (United States)
| popular_vote1 = 399,908
| percentage1 = 60.6%
| image2 = 
| nominee2 = John Raese
| party2 = Republican Party (United States)
| popular_vote2 = 240,787
| percentage2 = 36.5%
| map_image = 2012 United States Senate election in West Virginia results map by county.svg
| map_size = 250px
| map_caption = County resultsManchin:    Raese:  
| title = U.S. Senator
| before_election = Joe Manchin
| before_party = Democratic Party (United States)
| after_election = Joe Manchin
| after_party = Democratic Party (United States)
}}

The 2012 United States Senate election in West Virginia' was held on November 6, 2012, to elect one of West Virginia's two members of the U.S. Senate for a six-year term. In a rematch of the 2010 special election, incumbent Democratic U.S. Senator Joe Manchin won re-election to a first full term against the Republican nominee, John Raese. Notably, Manchin outperformed Barack Obama in the concurrent presidential election by 25.06 percentage points in vote share, and by 50.86 percentage points on margin.

 Background 
Robert Byrd held this seat in the U.S. Senate since 1959, after having served in the House of Representatives since 1953, making him the longest-serving person in Congress. Byrd led his party in the Senate from 1977 to 1989, as Majority Leader or Minority Leader. Afterward, as the most senior Democrat in the Senate, he served as President pro tempore of the Senate whenever his party was in the majority, including at the time of his death.

After Byrd's death, West Virginia Secretary of State Natalie Tennant initially announced that a special election would be held on the same day as the regular election for the six-year term. However, that special election was rescheduled to 2010 for it to coincide with the 2010 mid-term elections.

Governor Joe Manchin made a temporary appointment of Carte Goodwin to the vacant seat. Goodwin was later replaced by Manchin who won the 2010 special election.

 Democratic primary 

 Candidates 
 Sheirl Fletcher, former Republican State Delegate and Democratic candidate for the U.S. Senate in 2008 and 2010
 Joe Manchin, incumbent U.S. senator

 Results 

 General election 

 Candidates 
 Bob Henry Baber (Mountain), former mayor of Richwood and candidate for Governor in 2011
 Joe Manchin (Democratic), incumbent U.S. Senator
 John Raese (Republican), businessman and perennial candidate

 Campaign 
Raese filed a rematch against Manchin, arguing that he now had more material to criticize Manchin for. One example is how Manchin lost his longtime endorsement from the organization West Virginians for Life because of his vote against defunding Planned Parenthood, the nation's largest abortion provider. Another example is how he is undecided about whether or not to support Obama's re-election campaign. Senior Obama campaign advisor David Axelrod commented in response, "His concern is about his own political well-being." In addition, he voted against U.S. Congressman Paul Ryan's Republican budget.

Raese wrote an op-ed in the Charleston Gazette-Mail'', saying about Manchin, "Yes, he'll talk like a conservative and act like he's fiscally responsible to appeal to more moderate voters, but under that outward appearance of a lovable rube is the heart of a tax-and-spend liberal."

Raese continued to make controversial statements. In April 2012, he equated smoking bans with Adolf Hitler's yellow badge. He said "in Monongalia County now, I have to put a huge sticker on my buildings to say this is a smoke-free environment. This is brought to you by the government of Monongalia County. Okay? Remember Hitler used to put Star of David on everybody’s lapel, remember that? Same thing." That same day, he referred to President Franklin D. Roosevelt as "Fidel Roosevelt." Raese didn't apologize for his statements on Hitler saying "I am not going to be intimidated by a bunch of bullshit. I'm not apologizing to anybody or any organization. It's my perfect right to make a speech about meaningful subject matters in this country." He also called rocker Ted Nugent a "patriot" for criticizing President Barack Obama.

Fundraising

Top contributors

Top industries

Predictions

Polling

Results 
In spite of the Republicans winning every county in the presidential election, Manchin carried 52 of West Virginia's 55 counties.

See also 
 2012 United States Senate elections
 2012 United States House of Representatives elections in West Virginia
 2012 United States presidential election in West Virginia
 2012 West Virginia gubernatorial election

References

External links 
 Elections Division at the West Virginia secretary of state
 Campaign contributions at OpenSecrets.org
 Outside spending at Sunlight Foundation
 Candidate issue positions at On the Issues

Official campaign websites
 Joe Manchin for U.S. Senate
 John Raese for U.S. Senate

United States Senate
West Virginia
2012